Sadi (also Romanized as Sa‘dī) is a village in Abshar Rural District, in the Central District of Shadegan County, Khuzestan Province, Iran. At the 2006 census, its population was 414, in 67 families.

References 

Populated places in Shadegan County